This is a list of the Dutch Top 40 number-one singles of 2012. The Dutch Top 40 is a chart that ranks the best-performing singles of the Netherlands. It is published every week by radio station Radio 538. The chart had 51 releases in 2012.

Ten acts gained their first number-one single in the Dutch Top 40 in 2012, either as lead or featured act: Studio Killers, Michel Teló, Triggerfinger, Gusttavo Lima, will.i.am, Eva Simons, Asaf Avidan, Psy, Sandra van Nieuwland and Passenger.

Chart history

Number-one artists

See also
2012 in music
List of number-one singles in the Dutch Top 40

References

Number-one singles
Netherlands
2012